The 2014 Sacramento Republic FC season was the club's inaugural season of existence. The club played in USL Pro, the third tier of the American soccer pyramid. The season began March 29 and concluded on September 6. The Republic won the USL Pro Championship, defeating the Harrisburg City Islanders 2–0.

Background 

On December 3, 2012, USL Pro announced that a Sacramento expansion team would join the league for the 2014 season. On July 15, 2013, Predrag "Preki" Radosavljević was announced as head coach of the new franchise. The official name of the team and team shield were decided by fan vote. On July 18, 2013, the franchise officially announced the team name Sacramento Republic FC during the first annual Sacramento Soccer Day.

While the club always had plans to build a permanent stadium for home matches, an agreement was made between the Republic and Sacramento City College which would allow the Republic to use Hughes Stadium as their home pitch until a permanent home could be established. On November 14, 2013, the club announced that they'd reached an agreement with Ovation Food Service and Cal Expo to build an 8,000 seat, soccer-specific stadium on the site of the California State Fair. Later, the club announced a naming deal with local Sacramento company Bonney Plumbing Heating and Air which would formally change the stadium's name to Bonney Field.

The 2014 USL Pro season started March 22, with the Republic playing its first match on March 29 away to LA Galaxy II, ending in a 1–1 draw. Their first home game wasn't until nearly a month later, when they took on Harrisburg City Islanders in a 2–1 loss at Hughes Stadium.

Throughout the course of the 2014 season, the Republic regularly hosted sold-out crowds. At their first home game, the Republic smashed the existing regular season single game attendance record (previously held by Orlando City FC and set on August 11, 2013, with a total of 10,697 in attendance) during their first home match with a total of 20,231 in attendance. The Republic would meet this figure, selling out the stadium, in all but one of their games at Hughes.

Club

Roster 
As of August 20, 2014.

Technical staff 
As of July 6, 2014.

Competitions

Preseason

USL Pro 

All times from this point on Pacific Daylight Saving Time (UTC−07:00)

Results summary

Standings

USL Pro Playoffs

U.S. Open Cup

Friendlies

Statistics

Transfers

In

Out

Loan in

See also 
 2014 in American soccer
 2014 USL Pro season
 Sacramento Republic FC

References 

2014 USL Pro season
Sacramento Republic FC seasons
American soccer clubs 2014 season
2014 in sports in California